Ali Ersan Duru (born 19 September 1984) is a Turkish film and television actor known for his works including Bugünün Saraylisi (2013), Diriliş: Ertuğrul (2014) and Aşk Zamanı (2015).

Biography

Early life 
Ali Ersan Duru was born in Ankara on 19 September 1984. His father is in the tourism business, and his mother is a housewife. He is the youngest of his four brothers and thus was the most beloved and spoiled child in the family. However, this didn't stop him from doing well at school. He also loved to participate in performances at school when he was in his teens.

He dreamed of becoming a pilot so his father sent him to the cadet corps but due to his discipline being lame, the family council made a decision that this job wasn't suitable for him.

Career
Duru started to pursue a career in acting at the age of 18. He is a graduate of Eskişehir Osmangazi University with a degree in financial studies. At the same time, he started his acting career as an amateur stage actor. He first worked at the Osmangazi University Theatre Community. In 2008, he started getting acting lessons at Diyalog Sanat. He subsequently joined the Şahika Tekand Studio and was educated in theatrical studies for three years.

Duru made his television debut with a role in TRT 1 sitcom Başrolde Aşk in 2010. In 2012, he was cast in an adaptation of Turgut Özakman's novel Diriliş. In this movie, titled Çanakkale 1915, he portrayed the character Mehmed Ali. In 2013, he had a leading role in the series Yağmurdan Kaçarken alongside Carlos Martin, Ezgi Asaroğlu, Ayça Erturan, and Furkan Andıç. He continued to appear in a number of TV series. He portrayed the role of Al-Basti(Beybolat) in last season of Diriliş: Ertuğrul.   
In 2019, he was cast in a recurring role in the drama series Sen Anlat Karadeniz.

He also played the main role in a TV show that was made to strengthen the Turkish-Russian ties, Kalbimin Sultanı, which received a record number of views from both countries. In the show, his co-star was the Russian actress Alexandra Nikiforova. The series was filmed in 2018.

Personal life 
At the time when Şahane Damat was being filmed, he was dating his co-star Burcu Özberk (2016). Then for the following two years (2017–2018) he had a relationship with the Turkish model and actress Bestemsu Özdemir. Later he was spotted with actress Cansu Tosun but they announced that they were "just friends". Rumors of relationship with the Russian actress Alexandra Nikiforova were also denied. Ali Ersan Duru is currently single.

Filmography

Film

Television

References

External links 
 
 

Living people
1984 births
Turkish male television actors
Turkish male film actors
Male actors from Ankara